Thomas J. Stanley (1944 – February 28, 2015) was an American writer and business theorist. He was the author and co-author of several award-winning books on America's wealthy, including the New York Times’ best sellers The Millionaire Next Door and The Millionaire Mind. He served as chief advisor to Data Points, a company founded based on his research and data. He received a doctorate in business administration from the University of Georgia. He was on the faculty of the University at Albany, State University of New York. He taught marketing at the University of Tennessee, University of Georgia and Georgia State University (where he was named Omicron Delta Kappa's Outstanding Professor).

Thomas Stanley was born in the Bronx during 1944, where his father drove a subway car and his mother was a homemaker and secretary. He attended college in Connecticut, doing graduate work at the University of Tennessee. He earned a doctorate at the University of Georgia, and eventually moved to the Atlanta area to teach at Georgia State University. Stanley spent most of his career studying how the financially successful Americans in a wide range of professions and with a varying level of income acquired their wealth on their own. In 2015 he was killed by a drunk driver at the age of 71. During his last days, he was working on a book with his daughter, an industrial psychologist, who later finished it. The book is called The Next Millionaire Next Door: Enduring Strategies for Building Wealth, and attributes authorship to Thomas J. Stanley and his daughter, Sarah Stanley Fallaw.

Books 
Marketing to the Affluent, McGraw-Hill, 1988, 
Selling to the Affluent, McGraw-Hill, 1991, 
Networking with the Affluent and Their Advisors, McGraw-Hill, 1993, 
The Millionaire Next Door, Longstreet Press, 1996, 
The Millionaire Mind, Andrews McMeel Publishing, LLC,  2000 
Millionaire Women Next Door, Andrews McMeel Publishing, LLC, 2004, 
Stop Acting Rich: And Start Living Like A Real Millionaire, John Wiley & Sons, Inc, 2009,

Significant articles 
 "America's Affluent", American Demographics 1984
 "Investment Management and the Affluent Customer", The Bankers Magazine 1984
 "The Response of Affluent Consumers to Mail Surveys", Journal of Advertising Research 1986
 "How to Network with Affluent Client Prospects", Marketing for Lawyers 1993
 "How to Live Like a Millionaire", Reader's Digest, originally published as "Why You're Not as Wealthy as You Should Be", 1993
 "Ways to Add Value for Clients", Journal of Accountancy 1994
 "The Doctor who Manages his Own Investments Has a Fool for a Client", Medical Economics 2000

References

Further reading 
Richard Buck "Doctors Found To Be Among The Biggest Spenders", Seattle Times, October 3, 1992.
 "How to live like a millionaire", faqs.org
Excerpt from The doctor who manages his own investments has a fool for a client

External links 

Terry College of Business alumni
American business writers
American business theorists
American finance and investment writers
People from the Bronx
1944 births
2015 deaths
20th-century American non-fiction writers
21st-century American non-fiction writers
University at Albany, SUNY faculty
University of Georgia faculty
University of Tennessee faculty
Georgia State University faculty
Road incident deaths in Georgia (U.S. state)